Lucite Tokki is a female pop duo formed in Seoul in 2005. The group consists of Sun Young Kim (guitar) and Ye Jin Cho (vocal). Both of them were born and raised in South Korea and majored in music. The duo moved to the U.S. in 2016, and now they are based in New York.

Discography

Studio albums

Single albums

Singles

Soundtrack appearances

Awards and nominations

References

External links 
 
 Facebook
 TokkiTv YouTube

South Korean women
21st-century South Korean singers
People from Seoul
South Korean musical duos